Bertram Godfray Falle, 1st Baron Portsea (21 November 1859 – 1 November 1948), known as Sir Bertram Falle, Bt, between 1916 and 1930, was a Jersey-born barrister and politician in the United Kingdom.

Background and education
Falle was born on Jersey in the Channel Islands, the son of Joshua George Falle (1820–1903), Constable of Saint Helier and later Jurat of the Royal Court of Jersey, and Mary Elizabeth (née Godfray; died 1917). He was educated at Victoria College, Jersey, and graduated in 1886 from Pembroke College, Cambridge with a Master of Laws (LL.M.) degree, having been called to the bar, Inner Temple, in 1885. In 1901 he graduated from the University of Paris with a Bachelor en droit degree.

Legal and political career
Falle was a Judge of the Native Court in Egypt from 1901 to 1903. Standing as a Liberal Unionist, he was elected as one of the two members of parliament for the Portsmouth constituency in Hampshire at the January 1910 general election. He joined the Conservative Party when the two parties formally merged in 1912, although the Liberal Unionists had long been indistinguishable from the Conservatives. During the First World War he served in the Royal Field Artillery, gaining the rank of Major. When the Portsmouth constituency was abolished for the 1918 general election, he was returned as a Coalition Conservative for the new single-seat Portsmouth North constituency. Re-elected as a Conservative in 1922, he held the seat until his elevation to the peerage in 1934. Falle was made a Baronet, of Plaisance in the Island of Jersey, on 7 July 1916. In 1934 he was raised to the peerage as Baron Portsea, of Portsmouth in the County of Southampton. The title was apparently purchased for £50,000 by his wife.

Personal life
Falle married Mary, daughter of Russell Sturgis and widow of Lt.-Col. Leopold Richard Seymour, in 1906. Russell Sturgis had made his fortune in the opium trade before joining Barings Bank and later becoming head of the bank. There were no children from the marriage. Mary died in February 1942. Lord Portsea survived her by six years and died in November 1948, aged 88. The baronetcy and barony became extinct on his death. In accordance with his wishes, his sister Albina (who died in 1957) made a bequest to the States of Jersey which became the "Lord Portsea Gift Fund". The fund assists people from the Channel Islands who are unable to obtain sufficient financial support for additional training, re-training or specialised equipment to benefit their careers in the employment of the States of Jersey or of Guernsey, or of the United Kingdom.

References

External links 
 

1859 births
1948 deaths
People from Saint Helier
People educated at Victoria College, Jersey
Royal Artillery officers
British Army personnel of World War I
Alumni of Pembroke College, Cambridge
University of Paris alumni
Portsea, Bertram Falle, 1st Baron
Conservative Party (UK) MPs for English constituencies
Liberal Unionist Party MPs for English constituencies
Members of the Parliament of the United Kingdom for English constituencies
UK MPs 1910
UK MPs 1910–1918
UK MPs 1918–1922
UK MPs 1922–1923
UK MPs 1923–1924
UK MPs 1924–1929
UK MPs 1929–1931
UK MPs 1931–1935
UK MPs who were granted peerages
Politics of Portsmouth
Barons created by George V
British expatriates in France